Bağlar is a village in the Şemdinli District in Hakkâri Province in Turkey. The village is populated by Kurds of the Humaru and Zerzan tribes and had a population of 784 in 2022.

Bağlar has the nine hamlets of Çamlıca, Güzelkaya, Meşeli, Turi, Moşe, Çem, Rüzgarlı, Tuva and Zorgeçit attached to it.

History 
Nehrî was a sub-provincial centre and a small emirate in the 19th century ruled by the seyyids of Nehrî. The seyyids of Nehrî were an influential Naqshbandi Sheikh family whose leader Sheikh Sayyid Taha I gained influence after the defeat of Bedir Khan Beg in 1847, by inciting violence against Nestorians. The son of Sheikh Taha, Sheikh Ubeydullah was one of the most influential Kurdish leaders in the early 20th century by inciting the first nationalist Kurdish uprising against the Ottomans. Today, the village is populated by an unrelated Kurdish family as the land was confiscated by the central government after the uprising.

Population 
Population history of the village from 200 to 2022:

References 

Villages in Şemdinli District
Kurdish settlements in Hakkâri Province